Entisols are soils defined in USDA soil taxonomy that do not show any profile development other than an A horizon. An entisol has no diagnostic horizons, and most are basically unaltered from their parent material, which can be unconsolidated sediment or rock. Entisols are the most abundant soil order, occupying about 16% of the global ice-free land area.

Because of the diversity of their properties, suborders of entisols form individual Reference Soil Groups in the World Reference Base for Soil Resources (WRB): Psamments correlate with Arenosols and Fluvents with Fluvisols. Many Orthents belong to Regosols or Leptosols. Most Wassents and aquic subgroups of other suborders belong to the Gleysols.

In Australia, most entisols are known as rudosols or tenosols.

Causes of delayed or absent development 
 Unweatherable parent materials – sand, iron oxide, aluminium oxide, kaolinite clay.
 Erosion – common on shoulder slopes; other kinds also important.
 Deposition – continuous, repeated deposition of new parent materials by flood as diluvium, aeolian processes which means by wind, slope processes as colluvium, mudflows, other means.
 Flooding or saturation.
 Cold climate – must not be sufficiently cold in winter for permafrost.
 Dry climate.
 Shallow to bedrock – may be rock resistant to weathering, such as quartzite or ironstone.
 Toxic parent materials – serpentine soil, mine spoils, sulfidic clays.

Suborders 
Aquents – permanently or usually wet soils formed on river banks, tidal mudflats etc. Here, general wetness limits development.
Fluvents – alluvial soils where development is prevented by repeated deposition of sediment in periodic floods. Found in valleys and deltas of rivers, especially those with high sediment load.
Orthents – shallow or "skeletal soils". Found on recent erosional surfaces or very old landforms completely devoid of weatherable minerals.
Psamments – Entisols that are sandy in all layers where development is precluded by the impossibility of weathering the sand. Formed from shifting or glacial sand dunes.
Wassents – Entisols that have a positive water potential at the soil surface for more than 21 hours of each day in all years.

Paleopedology

Most fossil soils before the development of terrestrial vegetation in the Silurian are Entisols, showing no distinct soil horizons. Entisols have been abundant in the paleopedological record ever since then, though, unlike other soil orders (Oxisols, Ultisols, Gelisols for instance) they do not have value as indicators of climate – though orthents might in some cases be indicated of an extremely old landscape with very little soil formation (as in Australia today).

See also
Illuvium
Pedogenesis
Pedology (soil study)
Soil classification

References
 
 
 

Pedology
Types of soil